Souleymane Camara  (born 10 April 1984) is an Ivorian football striker whose last known club was Karvan in the Azerbaijan Premier League.

Career statistics

References

External links
Player profile

1984 births
Living people
Ivorian footballers
Expatriate footballers in Azerbaijan
Ivorian expatriate sportspeople in Azerbaijan
Footballers from Abidjan
Association football forwards
FK Karvan players